Romankenkius patagonicus is a species of freshwater triclad found in South America.

References

Dugesiidae